Travis Elementary School may refer to:
 William B. Travis Elementary School - Houston Independent School District - Houston, Texas
 Travis Elementary School - Travis Unified School District - Travis Air Force Base, California
 William B. Travis Elementary School - Ennis Independent School District - Ennis, Texas
 Travis Elementary School - Harlingen Consolidated Independent School District - Harlingen, Texas
 Travis Elementary School - Lamar Consolidated Independent School District - Rosenberg, Texas
 William B. Travis Elementary School - Marshall Independent School District - Marshall, Texas
 Travis Elementary School - San Marcos Consolidated Independent School District - San Marcos, Texas